Yuan Wan (born 23 May 1997) is a German table tennis player. Her highest career ITTF ranking was 142.

References

1997 births
Living people
German female table tennis players